A constitutional referendum was held in the Federated States of Micronesia on 27 August 2002. Voters were asked whether they approved of 14 separate amendments to the country's constitution. To be approved, the proposal required at least 75% of voters in at least three of the four states to vote in favour. Ultimately all 14 proposals were rejected, as none passed the 75% threshold in any state.

Background
The Micronesian constitution requires a referendum to be held every 10 years on convening a constitutional convention. Such a referendum had been held in 1999, with a majority in favour of a convention. A Constitutional Convention was subsequently elected in 2001. It sat from 12 November until 26 December 2001 and proposed 14 constitutional amendments.

On 8 March 2002 President Leo Falcam proposed holding a referendum on two proposals (electoral system and direct election of the president and vice president) on 27 August and the remaining eleven proposals to be held alongside the 2003 parliamentary elections. However, he changed the plans on 19 April so that all 14 proposals would be put to voters on the same day.

Proposed constitutional amendments

Results

References

2002 referendums
2002 in the Federated States of Micronesia
Referendums in the Federated States of Micronesia
Constitutional referendums